Cimon or Kimon may refer to:

Cimon (510–450 BCE), an Athenian statesmen and general
Greek ship Kimon, for warships named after him
Cimon (robot), an AI head-shaped robot used in the International Space Station
Cimon Coalemos (6th century BCE), ancient Olympic chariot-racer and father of Miltiades
Cimon, in Roman mythology, father of Pero – see Roman Charity.
Cimon of Cleonae, an early painter of ancient Greece
Cimone, Italy
kimon, a Japanese demon gate direction, see Oni
Kimon, a music video compilation in the Dir En Grey discography